Jerry Lee Bird (February 3, 1934 – July 16, 2017) was an American basketball player. Born in Corbin, Kentucky, he played collegiately for the University of Kentucky. He was selected by the Minneapolis Lakers in the 1956 NBA draft and played eleven NBA games for the New York Knicks (1958–59).

References

External links

1935 births
2017 deaths
Basketball players from Kentucky
Forwards (basketball)
Kentucky Wildcats men's basketball players
Minneapolis Lakers draft picks
New York Knicks players
People from Corbin, Kentucky
American men's basketball players